Elkhart is a town the U.S. state of Texas, in Anderson County. Named for a friendly Native American who assisted the early settlers of the area, Elkhart's population was 1,287 at the 2020 U.S. census.

History 
The history of Elkhart starts with Daniel Parker's Pilgrim Predestinarian Baptist Church. It was formed in Crawford County, Illinois in 1833, because the government of Mexico would not allow the Baptist church's organization within their borders. Daniel, and his father John Parker, led their congregation to Texas, settling in Austin's Colony in 1834. While John Parker's group settled  and established Fort Parker (Limestone County), Daniel's group settled first in the territory that became Grimes County and later moved to the area around Fort Houston (Anderson County). Daniel Parker spent his time traveling and preaching in the homes of his scattered congregation. In 1836, the threats of General Santa Anna's troops in April 1836, and the attack of Fort Parker in May 1836 sent the remnant of John Parker's group to seek protection near Fort Houston. The Pilgrim Church resumed meetings in February 1837, and resolved in 1839 to build a church house, selecting 2.5 acres "on the north side of the bluff of the Harrison Fork of Bayou Blue near Daniel Parker's house". They constructed a log house and cleared a burial ground where Daniel Parker was buried in 1844. The church, now called Old Pilgrim Church, which has been replaced several times since the first log house, was the center of the community called Parker's Settlement, or just Pilgrim.

About the same time Parker's followers were getting established, the first Methodist sermon was given by Rev. William Stevenson, whose members built their church about 1840, one mile west of Pilgrim Baptist Church.

The community was granted a post office in March 1850, named Elkheart (later changed to Elkhart) which was located 4 miles south of Elkhart's current position, and named for a Native who had helped the early settlers.

As the Houston to Palestine rail was being finished in 1872, Elkhart shifted north to the train depot, and thus began to be considered the "railroad village" associated with the Parker settlement.

Geography 
Elkhart is located in southern Anderson County at  (31.628429, –95.578588).

Demographics 

As of the 2020 United States census, there were 1,287 people, 453 households, and 316 families residing in the town.

At the census of 2000, there were 1,215 people, 473 households, and 321 families residing in the town. The population density was 783.0 people per square mile (302.7/km2). There were 532 housing units at an average density of 342.8 per square mile (132.5/km2). The racial makeup of the town was 89.05% White, 8.15% African American, 0.41% Native American, 0.82% from other races, and 1.56% from two or more races. Hispanic or Latino of any race were 3.05% of the population. In 2020, its population was 1,287. Among the population in 2020, its racial and ethnic makeup remained predominantly non-Hispanic white, though Black or African Americans were the second largest group.

The median income for a household in the town was $25,927, and the median income for a family was $33,977 in 2000. Males had a median income of $27,841 versus $21,705 for females. The per capita income for the town was $13,809. About 12.9% of families and 20.0% of the population were below the poverty line, including 24.1% of those under age 18 and 32.5% of those age 65 or over. In 2020, its median household income was $37,159, and 19.9% of its population lived at or below the poverty line.

Education 
The town of Elkhart is served by the Elkhart Independent School District.

Notable people 
 F. Tillman Durdin, journalist
 Tye Sheridan, actor
 Jeff Wilson (American football), NFL Running Back for the Miami Dolphins

References

External links 
 Entry in the Handbook of Texas Online

Towns in Anderson County, Texas